The following is a list of events relating to television in Ireland from 1967.

Events

April – RTÉ Television abandons its plans to provide coverage of the Vietnam War following intervention from the Irish government.
16 July – The Irish language current affairs programme, Féach is first aired by RTÉ Television.
30 September – The popular and long-running children's programme, Wanderly Wagon is first aired on television.

Debuts
9 August – It's Too Late - We're On! (1967)
30 September – Wanderly Wagon (1967–1982)
20 November – Me and My Friend (1967–1968)

Ongoing television programmes
RTÉ News: Nine O'Clock (1961–present)
Dáithí Lacha (1962–1969)
RTÉ News: Six One (1962–present)
The Late Late Show (1962–present)
Tolka Row (1964–1968)
Newsbeat (1964–1971)
The Riordans (1965–1979)
Quicksilver (1965–1981)
Seven Days (1966–1976)

Ending this year
20 September – It's Too Late - We're On! (1967)

See also
1967 in Ireland

References

 
1960s in Irish television